RIR may refer to:

 Regional Internet registry, nonprofit corporations that administer and register Internet Protocol (IP) address space and Autonomous Systems (AS)

Companies and organizations
 Richmond International Raceway
 Riverside International Raceway
 Royal Irish Regiment, either:
 Royal Irish Regiment (1684-1922)
 Royal Irish Regiment (1992)

Media and entertainment
 Real Illusions: Reflections, an album by American guitarist Steve Vai
 Rock in Rio, a recurring music festival, originating in Rio de Janeiro, Brazil
 Rush in Rio, a live album by Canadian band Rush

Political parties 

 React-Include-Recycle, a political party of Portugal

Other uses
 Rhode Island Red, a breed of chicken